Lipotriches karnatakaensis is a species of bee in the genus Lipotriches, of the family Halictidae.

References
 http://www.discoverlife.org/mp/20q?search=Lipotriches+karnatakaensis&guide=Apoidea_species&cl=CE&flags=HAS:
 http://www.atlashymenoptera.net/search.asp?search=nomia

Halictidae
Insects described in 2009